Cheirocratidae is a family of amphipods belonging to the order Amphipoda.

Genera:
 Casco Shoemaker, 1930
 Cheirocarpochela Ren & Andres, 2006
 Cheirocratella Stephensen, 1940
 Cheirocratus Norman, 1867
 Degocheirocratus Karaman, 1985
 Incratella Barnard & Drummond, 1981
 Prosocratus Barnard & Drummond, 1982

References

Amphipoda